The 1978 United States Senate election in Kansas took place on November 7, 1978. Incumbent Republican Senator James B. Pearson did not run for re-election to a third full term. 

Nancy Landon Kassebaum, the daughter of former Governor Alf Landon, won the election, defeating a large field of Republican candidates in the primary and Democratic former U.S. Representative Bill Roy in the general election.  

Roy lost by a much smaller margin four years earlier against Kansas' other U.S. Senator, Bob Dole. 

Kassebaum became the first woman elected to a full term in the Senate without her husband having previously served in Congress. In fact, at the time of the election, she was separated from her husband John Philip Kassebaum. Their divorce was finalized in 1979, making Kassebaum the first single divorcée to serve in the U.S. Senate.

Republican primary

Candidates
Wayne Angell, former State Representative from Ottawa
L. C. Fitzjarrell, resident of Stilwell
Norman Gaar, State Senator from Westwood
Bill Gibbs, resident of Overland Park
Sam Hardage, hotel executive from Wichita, Kansas
Ken Henderson
Nancy Landon Kassebaum, aide to retiring Senator Pearson and daughter of Alf Landon
Jan Meyers, State Senator from Overland Park
Deryl K. Schuster, resident of Shawnee

Results

Democratic primary

Candidates
James R. Maher, resident of Overland Park
Roland Preboth, nominee for Secretary of State in 1964
Bill Roy, former U.S. Representative and nominee for Senate in 1974
Dorothy K. White, resident of Wichita

Results

Though he was defeated in the Democratic primary, James Maher ran in the general election as the nominee of the Conservative Party.

General election

Results

See also 
 1978 United States Senate elections

References 

1978
Kansas
United States Senate